The coastal shiner (Notropis petersoni) is a species of ray-finned fish in the genus Notropis. It is endemic to the United States where it is found in Atlantic and Gulf slope drainages from the Cape Fear and Waccamaw river drainages, North Carolina, south to southern Florida, and west to Jordan River in Mississippi.

References 

 Robert Jay Goldstein, Rodney W. Harper, Richard Edwards: American Aquarium Fishes. Texas A&M University Press 2000, p. 97
 

Notropis
Fish described in 1942